Amphidromus martensi is a species of air-breathing land snail, a terrestrial pulmonate gastropod mollusk in the family Camaenidae.

References

External links 

martensi
Gastropods described in 1894